Commonwealth Bank building may refer to:
 Commonwealth Bank Building, Gladstone, Queensland
 Commonwealth Bank Building, Mackay, Queensland
 Commonwealth Bank Building, Mount Morgan, Queensland
 Commonwealth Bank Building, Townsville, Queensland
 Commonwealth Trading Bank Building, Sydney, New South Wales